The 2014–15 Men's FIH Hockey World League Final took place from 27 November to 6 December 2015 in Raipur, India. A total of 8 teams competed for the title.

Australia won the tournament for the first time after defeating Belgium 2–1 in the final match. Host nation India won the third place match by defeating the Netherlands 3–2 on a penalty shootout after a 5–5 draw.

Qualification
The host nation qualified automatically in addition to 7 teams qualified from the Semifinals. The following eight teams, shown with final pre-tournament rankings, competed in this round of the tournament.

Umpires
Below are the 10 umpires appointed by the International Hockey Federation:

Grant Hundley (USA)
Adam Kearns (AUS)
Germán Montes de Oca (ARG)
Raghu Prasad (IND)
Ayden Shrives (RSA)
Gurinder Singh (IND)
Nathan Stagno (GBR)
David Sweetman (GBR)
David Tomlinson (NZL)
Paul Walker (GBR)

Results
All times are Indian Standard Time (UTC+05:30)

First round

Pool A

Pool B

Second round

Quarterfinals

Fifth to eighth place classification
The losing quarterfinalists were ranked according to their first round results to determine the fixtures for the fifth to eighth place classification matches.

Seventh and eighth place

Fifth and sixth place

First to fourth place classification

Semifinals

Third and fourth place

Final

Awards

Statistics

Final standings

Goalscorers

References

External links
Official website

Final
International field hockey competitions hosted by India
2015 in Indian sport
Sport in Raipur, Chhattisgarh